Ankeny Centennial High School (ACHS) is a public high school in Ankeny, Iowa, United States, serving grades 10 through 12 and opened in 2013. It is one of two high schools in the Ankeny Community School District.

History
Ankeny Centennial opened in 2013, covering the northern part of the school district. ACHS relieved Ankeny High School of overcrowding as the district's second high school; both schools had approximately 990 students in the 2013–14 school year. This was the first instance within a period of forty-year period where a school district in the state of Iowa had its number of high schools increase from one to two. Ankeny Centennial is structurally identical to the 2011 rebuild of Ankeny High School.

Athletics
The Jaguars are members of the Central Iowa Metro League.

Performing arts
ACHS has five competitive show choirs: the mixed-gender "Spectrum", "Eternal Rush", "Chaos" and "Project X" as well as the all-female "Rhythmic Momentum". The program hosts an annual competition, the Mid-Iowa Show Choir Championships. Spectrum finished second at a national invite in 2016 and was undefeated in its 2020 season, capturing vocal and choreography awards at every competition.

ACHS also has a competitive Marching Band who performs and competes through Iowa in addition to having twice been selected to perform in the New York City Veterans Day Parade. The Band program features a Wind Symphony, a Symphonic Band, and a 9th Grade Concert Band. In addition the program has four jazz bands: Jazz Collective, Jazz Studio, Jazz Vanguard, and Jazz Lab.

See also
List of high schools in Iowa

References

External links
 Ankeny Centennial High School

2013 establishments in Iowa
Ankeny, Iowa
Educational institutions established in 2013
Public high schools in Iowa